Alspach is a surname. Notable people with the surname include:

Alfred Alspach (1912–2002), American politician and civic leader
Brian Alspach (born 1938), American mathematician
Ted Alspach (born 1968), American board game designer and author